Anton Staus (5 September 1872 – 21 July 1955) was a German astronomer.

As a young man, he discovered the inner main-belt asteroid 335 Roberta at Heidelberg Observatory in 1892. It was the 12th asteroid that was discovered using photography.

References

External links 
Obituary Anton Staus Quote Astronomische Gesellschaft, volume 9, page 5, 1958 (in German)

1872 births
1955 deaths
20th-century German astronomers
Discoverers of asteroids
19th-century German astronomers